The Florence Mill, known later as the U. S. Envelope Building, is a former industrial facility located at 121 West Main Street in the Rockville section of Vernon, Connecticut.  Developed in stages between 1864 and 1916, it exhibits changes in mill construction technology over that period, include a rare early example of Second Empire architecture.  Now converted into senior housing, it was listed on the National Register of Historic Places in 1978.

Description and history
The former Florence Mill complex is located in Vernon's industrial Rockland section, on the south side of West Main Street opposite its junction with Ward Street. To this are appended a number of later buildings, also built out of brick, with later industrial Italianate features.

The Florence Mill was built in 1864 to replace an earlier textile mill which was destroyed by fire.  In 1881, it was described as the largest brick building in Rockville, and continued in the production of textiles. It was purchased in 1881 by White & Corbin, who expanded the building several times, making it the largest manufacturing plant in the United States for the manufacture of envelopes.  The building was used for this purpose by White & Corbin and its successors (including the U. S. Envelope Company), until 1975.   Currently, the building is used as an independent living retirement home and has 113 apartments.

See also
National Register of Historic Places listings in Tolland County, Connecticut

References

Lewis Angel Corbin Biography, as recorded in: Commemorative Biographical Record of Tolland and Winham Counties Connecticut, Biographical Sketches of Prominent and Representative Citizens and of many of the early  settled families, Publisher: J.H.Beers & Co., CHICAGO; 1903 P. 212

Second Empire architecture in Connecticut
Queen Anne architecture in Connecticut
Italianate architecture in Connecticut
Industrial buildings completed in 1864
Vernon, Connecticut
Industrial buildings and structures on the National Register of Historic Places in Connecticut
Apartment buildings in Connecticut
Buildings and structures in Tolland County, Connecticut
Residential buildings in Connecticut
Residential buildings on the National Register of Historic Places in Connecticut
National Register of Historic Places in Tolland County, Connecticut
Envelopes
1864 establishments in Connecticut